George E. Williams may refer to:

George E. Williams (geologist), Australian geologist
George E. Williams (New Jersey politician), member of the New Jersey General Assembly
George E. Williams (New York politician) (1828–1914), New York assemblyman, 1879
George Emlyn Williams (1905–1987), Welsh dramatist and actor

See also
George Williams (disambiguation)